Promise Land is an Italian DJ and production duo from Milan, consisting of Nazario Pelusi and Fabio Ranucci.

"Why I Still Love You", "Bad DJ", and "Noise" are their main success, respectively ranked 14th, 13th and 23rd in the top 100 established by Beatport.

Discography

Extended plays

Singles

Charted singles

Other singles
 2009: We Save Your Life [Netswork Records]
 2009: Last Night a Dj Saved My Life [Netswork Records]
 2010: You Can't Stop the Love (with Provenzano) [Netswork Records]
 2010: Feel the Pushing [Netswork Records]
 2010: Push the Feeling On [Netswork Records]
 2011: Wrong [Dirty Dutch Music]
 2011: Heaven (with COZi) [Netswork Records]
 2011: Piece of Heaven (Vocal Radio) (with COZi) [Netswork Records]
 2011: Slipped Disc (with MYNC) [Cr2 Records]
 2011: Endless (with Gregori Klosman) [Flamingo Recordings]
 2011: Killer [Dirty Dutch Music]
 2011: Never Be Lonely [Subliminal]
 2011: Alarma (Make Your Body Sing) (with Dimitri Vegas & Like Mike, Mitch Crown) [Smash The House]
 2012: Never Be Lonely [Strictly Rhythm]
 2012: Breaking Up (with Chuckie, Amanda Wilson) [Dirty Dutch]
 2013: Gangsta [Spinnin Records]
 2013: Rulez [Spinnin Records]
 2013: Noise (with Junior Black) [DOORN (Spinnin)]
 2013: Bad Dj [Size Records]
 2014: Vega [DOORN (Spinnin)]
 2015: Burn (with Chuckie) [Dirty Dutch Music]
 2015: Why I Still Love You [Size Records]
 2015: Memories Will Fade (with Yves V) [Smash The House]
 2015: Love I Feel [Sosumi]
 2015: Alright [Flamingo Recordings]
 2015: Let the Groove [Sosumi]
 2015: Wood
 2016: X-Press [DOORN (Spinnin)]
 2016: Rebound [DOORN (Spinnin)]
 2016: Rebound to the Beat (featuring Luciana) [DOORN (Spinnin)]
 2016: Scratchin'  (with Daddy's Groove) [Doorn Records]
 2016: Pressure (with Matt Nash) [Staar Traxx]
2019: I N33D [Hexagon Records]

Remixes
 2009: Fedde Le Grand, Mitch Crown - Scared Of Me featuring Mitch Crown (Promise Land & Provenzano Remix) [Flamingo Recordings]
 2009: The Playin' Stars - You Needed Me (Promise Land Remix) [Rise]
 2010: Ambush, Chuckie, Hardwell - Move It 2 The Drum (Promise Land Remix) [Dirty Dutch Music]
 2011: Flo Rida - Who Dat Girl (Promise Land Instrumental) [Poe Boy/Atlantic]
 2011: Chuckie, Gregori Klosman - Mutfakta (Promise Land Remix) [Dirty Dutch Music]
 2011: Dim Chris - You Found Me (featuring Amanda Wilson) (Promise Land Miami 305 Mix) [Paradise Records]
 2011: John Dahlback - You're In My Heart (Promise Land Remix) [Mutants]
 2011: DJ Bam Bam, Alex Peace - Keep Movin' (Promise Land Remix) [Big Beat]
 2012: Rebecca Stella - Give Me That O (Promise Land Remix) [Ultra]
 2012: Jeremy Carr - Just One Breath (Promise Land Remix Extended) [Delirious]
 2012: Swedish House Mafia - Don't You Worry Child (featuring John Martin) (Promise Land Remix) [Virgin UK]
 2013: Max Vangeli, AN21 - Glow (Promise Land vs. AN21 & Max Vangeli Remix) [Size Records]
 2014: Flatdisk - One More Chance (Promise Land Edit) [Cr2 Records]
 2015: Tristan Garner, Norman Doray, Errol Reid - Last Forever 2015 (Promise Land Remix) [Cr2 Mainroom]

References

External links
Official website
Beatport

Italian DJs
Italian house musicians
Electronic music duos
Electro house musicians
Spinnin' Records artists
Electronic dance music DJs